Nationality words link to articles with information on the nation's poetry or literature (for instance, Irish or France).

Events
 About this year, the Sturm und Drang movement begins in German literature (including poetry) and music; it will last through the early 1780s. (The conventional translation is "Storm and Stress"; a more literal translation, however, might be "storm and urge", "storm and longing", "storm and drive" or "storm and impulse").

Works published
 Michael Bruce, Elegy Written in Spring
 Francis Fawkes, Partridge-Shooting: An eclogue
 Oliver Goldsmith, editor, The Beauties of English Poesy, an anthology
 Francis Hopkinson, the Psalms of David [...] in Metre, English, Colonial America
 Richard Jago, Edge-Hill; or, The Rural Prospect Delineated and Moralised
 Henry Jones, Kew Gardens
 Moses Mendes, editor, A Collection of the Most Esteemed Pieces of Poetry, an anthology
 William Mickle, The Concubine (reissued as Sir Martin 1778)
 John Wesley and Charles Wesley, Hymns for the Use of Families
 Phillis Wheatley, a poem published in the Newport Mercury in Rhode Island. The author at this time was a 13-year-old slave girl in Boston, Massachusetts who had learned English at the age of seven when she arrived in America in 1761; Colonial America

Works wrongly said to be published this year
 Oliver Goldsmith, editor, Poems for Young Ladies, an anthology; although the book states it was published this year, it first appeared in 1766

Births
Death years link to the corresponding "[year] in poetry" article:
 March 1 – Alexander Balfour (died 1829), Scottish novelist, short-story writer and poet
 September 8 – August Wilhelm Schlegel (died 1845), German poet, translator, critic, and a leader of German Romanticism

Deaths
Birth years link to the corresponding "[year] in poetry" article:
 May 17 – Roger Wolcott (born 1679), English Colonial American, governor of Connecticut and poet
 June 25 – Georg Philipp Telemann (died 1681), German composer and poet
 July 15 – Michael Bruce (born 1746), Scottish poet
 December 21 – Leonard Howard (born 1699?), English clergyman, "poet laureate of the King's Bench Prison"

See also

 List of years in poetry
 List of years in literature
 18th century in poetry
 18th century in literature
 18th-century French literature
 List of years in poetry
 Poetry

Notes

18th-century poetry
Poetry